Warrior of Light is an International Ukrainian-Belarusian Mikhail Zhyzneuski Memorial Award. Zhyzneuski was a Euromaidan activist and journalist, a member of the Self-Defense Maidan, Chevalier of the Order of Heavenly Hundred Heroes. It was founded in August 2015 based on the results of the International Ukrainian-Belarusian seminar held on July 1–2, 2015 in the Writer's Union of Ukraine. The prize is awarded annually "for the book of Ukrainian or Belarusian author, which as a noble, brave hero who fights for justice, preaches high human values, and is an example for others to follow." The laureates are awarded a diploma, cash prize, and Warrior of Light statuette with an inscription. The inaugural presentation went to Bogdan Zholdak for his novel "Ukry" and Belarusian writer Anatol' Barouski for the book "Chosen will".

Description 
Warrior of Light is an International Ukrainian-Belarusian Mikhail Zhyzneuski Memorial Award. Zhyzneuski was a Euromaidan activist and journalist, a member of the Self-Defense Maidan, Chevalier of the Order of Heavenly Hundred Heroes. The prize is awarded annually "for the book of Ukrainian or Belarusian author, which as a noble, brave hero who fights for justice, preaches high human values, and is an example for others to follow." The laureate is awarded a diploma, cash prize, and Warrior of Light statuette with an inscription.

History 
The prize was founded in August 2015 based on the results of the International Ukrainian-Belarusian seminar held on July 1–2, 2015 in the Writer's Union of Ukraine. Belarusian participants noted that Ukraine is for Belarusians new geopolitical center that will help Belarus to survive in conditions of total Russification and the attack of the Russian world. According to the organizers, the competition involved writers from Belarus and Ukraine, with one winner from each country.

On January 26, 2016 in Kyiv, the Warrior of Light prizes were handed out for the best  Ukrainian and Belarusian prose books that advocate freedom, justice, and human ideals. Chairman of the Kyiv city organization of the Writer's Union of Ukraine, Vladimir Danilenko, during the presentation of the literary award said:

Danilenko noted that this year's presentation is the debut of the award, but the organizers are planning to make such an award every year in Ukraine and revive the direction of chivalry.

The Ukrainian winner Bohdan Zholdak said during the presentation ceremony that his novel is devoted to the real history of the deceased Anti-Terrorist Operation fighters:

The Belarusian winner Anatol' Barouski said he was glad to receiving the award, and expressed hope that the Ukrainian people will win in the struggle for freedom:

See also

 Kobzar Literary Award
 List of literary awards
 List of poetry awards
 Shevchenko National Prize
 Vasyl Stus Prize

Literature 
 Алла Миколаєнко. «Воїн Світла»: Під цією назвою засновано українсько-білоруську премію пам'яті Михайла Жизневського // Літературна Україна. — 2015. — No. 26 (16 лип.). — С. 3 — (Наша спілка).

References 

Belarusian literary awards
Ukrainian literary awards
Belarus–Ukraine relations
Awards established in 2015
2015 establishments in Belarus
2015 establishments in Ukraine